Wolf Warrior 2 is a 2017 Chinese action film co-written, co-produced, and directed by Wu Jing, who also starred in the lead role. The film co-stars Celina Jade, Frank Grillo, Hans Zhang, and Wu Gang. The film is a sequel to 2015's Wolf Warrior. It was released in China on 27 July 2017. The film tells a story of a loose cannon Chinese soldier named Leng Feng who takes on special missions around the world. In this sequel, he finds himself in an unnamed African country protecting medical aid workers from local rebels and vicious arms dealers.

In China, Wolf Warrior 2 received general praise for its patriotic plot, special effects, action sequences and the cast's performances. It was a massive commercial success and has become the highest-grossing Chinese film ever released. The film broke numerous box office records, including the biggest single-day gross for a Chinese film as well as the fastest film to cross RMB 2 billion, 3 billion, 4 billion and 5 billion box office marks. It also became the fastest film to surpass US$500 million and the first film to gross more than US$600 million at the Chinese box office. The film was the seventh highest-grossing film of 2017 at US$874 million, making it the 54th highest-grossing film worldwide. It is the first non-English film ever to be included in the list of 100 all-time highest-grossing films worldwide, making it the highest-grossing non-English film of all time, a position it retained until 2021 when The Battle at Lake Changjin, another film Wu starred in, took top spot. It was selected as the Chinese entry for the Best Foreign Language Film at the 90th Academy Awards.

Plot
After the events of Wolf Warrior, Leng Feng and members of his special-ops team bring his fallen comrade's remains back to his hometown. As the family prepare for the funeral, a real estate company is about to demolish their house. The boss of the real estate company confronts and sneers at Feng and his team for their patriotism, and he is kicked to the ground. 

The boss orders his henchmen to attack them but they are all swiftly disabled by Feng and his team. Police arrive shortly after and order Feng to stand down. The boss gets back up and boasts that he will "make the family wish they were dead", enraging Feng, who kills him. Feng is sent to a military prison for two years and then discharged from the Chinese army.

After his release from prison, Feng leaves for Africa, planning to wander aimlessly around the continent. While serving as a mercenary providing security for a freighter delivering relief supplies to Africa, he foils an attempted hijacking by Somalian pirates, defeating them in hand-to-hand combat underwater. The freighter arrives safely at its destination. For three years, Feng has been carrying a bullet he found, which was a clue to the kidnapping of his fiancée, Lieutenant Colonel Long Xiaoyun, that happened while she was on a mission.

Feng and some locals are partying on a beach when they are attacked by rebel forces aiming to overthrow the African nation. Shortly after the rebels and their mercenaries overrun the government troops, the Chinese fleet arrives to evacuate Chinese nationals caught up in the civil war.

While on board a Chinese military ship, a shop owner that Feng rescued informs him that the bullet he is carrying belongs to European mercenaries who are helping the rebels. Feng volunteers to rescue workers at a Chinese factory and also a VIP, Dr. Chen, who was held hostage in a nearby hospital. Dr Chen is developing a vaccine for Lamanla, a deadly endemic disease. However, Feng will be on his own. No China military personnel could accompany him because they are on foreign soil, and must wait for permission from the Chinese military's higher authorities.

Feng travels to the hospital but during the hostage rescue, Dr Chen is accidentally killed by the rebels and their mercenaries. Dying, Dr Chen tells Feng to take his daughter, an African girl named Pasha. The mercenaries are led by Big Daddy, a ruthless American working for Dyon Corps. Feng and Pasha, together with Rachel Smith, a surviving doctor, escape but Feng cuts his hand when he falls on some Lamanla-infected dead bodies. 

Feng continues to the Chinese-owned Hanbound factory to save the workers and his godson's mother, who also works there. Upon arrival, Feng is confronted by the suspicious factory security team led by the factory owner's son, Zhuo Yifan, a cocky fuerdai young man who is also an ardent Chinese army fan. Feng informs everyone that the Chinese fleet plans to send a helicopter to rescue them. The women and children will evacuate via helicopter and everyone else will travel by road to join the fleet. 

Big Daddy's mercenaries attack the factory to capture Pasha, as they believe she holds the cure for Lamanla. Feng rallies the workers to fight to protect their families and their fellow factory workers. Feng is about to be overwhelmed and killed when Big Daddy and his men are unexpectedly ordered to fall back. The rebel leader informs Big Daddy that no Chinese can be harmed as he needs China's support when he comes into power, since China is a permanent member of the United Nations Security Council. However, Big Daddy kills the leader and takes over, ordering everyone back to the factory to capture Pasha and kill Feng.

Meanwhile, Feng chooses to leave after the factory workers discover that he is infected with the deadly Lamanla virus. Dr Rachel Smith injects him with a serum and he learns that Dr Chen had discovered a cure using infected patients who survived and developed immunity. Pasha is one of Dr. Chen's patients and not his daughter, and she is the only surviving infected patient with immunity.

Big Daddy and his men return to the factory and round up the workers who were waiting for the Chinese helicopter to arrive. Feng returns with Rachel and Pasha in a rescue attempt. The workers are saved and then the helicopter arrives. Pasha and Rachel leave in the helicopter with the other women and children, but the helicopter is shot down. The battle continues with Feng and his allies fighting hordes of Dyon Corps mercenaries and rebels, who are reinforced by several tanks. Seeing the massive battle casualties, the Chinese fleet fire missiles to take out the tanks. 

In the battle climax, Feng confronts Big Daddy and learns that the bullet which killed Xiaoyun belonged to Big Daddy. Driven by rage, he kills Big Daddy after a brutal fight. Then, Feng leads the survivors in a convoy through rebel territory until they reach the UN camp.

In the mid-credits scene, Feng is allowed by his commander to return to his military squadron and is shown a video revealing that Xiaoyun is still alive.

Cast

 Wu Jing as Leng Feng, a former Chinese special forces soldier.
 Celina Jade as Dr. Rachel Prescott Smith, a doctor working in Africa.
 Frank Grillo as Big Daddy, head of a group of mercenaries called Dyon Corps.
 Hans Zhang as Zhuo Yifan, a fuerdai and army fan. His father owns a factory in Africa which he supervises.
 Wu Gang as He Jianguo, a retired scout who serves as a security supervisor of a Chinese factory in Africa.
 Yu Nan as Lieutenant Colonel Long Xiaoyun (guest appearance)
 Yu Qian as Qian Bida, a profiteer who gets caught in a rebel crossfire battle in an African port town.
 Ding Haifeng as a captain in the People's Liberation Army Navy.
 Shi Zhaoqi as Shi Qingsong
 Chunyu Shanshan as Lin Zhixiong
 Oleg Prudius as Great Bear, a Russian Dyon Corps mercenary who serves as muscle and a heavy machine gunner.
 Heidi Moneymaker as Athena, a sniper of the Dyon Corps mercenaries.
 Aaron Ly as Ghost, the driver and the most stealthy member of the Dyon Corps mercenaries.
 Aaron Toney as Roach, a Dyon Corps mercenary and Big Daddy's second in command.

Production

Background
The Wolf Warrior 2 continues the storyline of Wolf Warrior. However, the action takes place overseas, rather than in China, which helps develop an international perspectives. The film was shot on locations in Africa and China between June 2016 and November 2016. The film's African scenes were mostly shot on location in Soweto and Alexandria. The tank battle was filmed in Zhaochuan Ironworks, Zhaochuan Town of Xuanhua District, Zhangjiakou city, in Hebei province.

A promotional poster contained the slogan "Anyone who offends China, no matter how remote, must be exterminated."

Pre-production
Wu Jing started work on the script in 2009 and on 16 April 2013, the first draft of Wolf Warrior 2 was completed.

Filming
On 19 June 2016, the filming of Wolf Warrior 2 was launched started up in Beijing. Wu Jing spent six months preparing for the launch.

In one scene on 23 August 2016, Wu Jing drove a tank alone, rushed through six tanks and crushed a car in the end. In just ten seconds, the car turned into a pile of scrap iron. This is the first time that a domestic actor personally drove a tank into and crushed a car. A car weighs approximately one ton while a tank weighs around thirty-five tons.

On 2 November 2016, Wolf Warrior 2 was completed after five months of filming.

Release
The film was released in China on 27 July 2017 in MX4D, 4DX, 3D and China Film Giant Screen. An IMAX version was released on 18 August 2017 and has gone out in IMAX 2D. The film was released in Sri Lanka through Madhu Entertainment with English subtitles. It was also released in South Africa with English Subtitles through Ster-Kinekor on 10 November 2017.

Reception

Box office
Wolf Warrior 2 became a huge commercial success at the Chinese box office, and also in countries such as Australia and Malaysia where there were reports of sold out tickets in Chinese language cinemas. The film was noted for showing incredible staying power at the box office despite being a tent pole movie, earning seven times its prequel and five times distributors' initial estimates. It topped the international box office for all major films on three separate occasions – in its first three weekends. Its unprecedented success has been attributed to various reasons such as its patriotic subject, nationalistic themes, and its bona-fide action sequences and stunts that have been said to be a breakthrough for Chinese films. The film was also released during the annual summer "blackout period" in which foreign movies are not released, and it only had to compete with other domestic movies. It became the highest-grossing film in China after just twelve days of release, overtaking The Mermaid which held the record for eighteen months. However, the records that the film broke were not just limited to its domestic market. It also became the biggest film released in a single territory in 2017, breaking Beauty and the Beasts record of US$504 million and the biggest summer release of the year in a single territory, ahead of Wonder Woman (US$400 million). As a result, it became the tenth film to earn over US$500 million in a single territory and the sixth film to make over US$600 million, and the third film to pass the US$700 million threshold following Avatar and Star Wars: The Force Awakens. US$30 million) for twelve consecutive days globally (tied with Star Wars: The Force Awakens).

It opened in China on Thursday 27 July 2017, across 19,000+ screens, occupying 42% of the nation's total screens and earned  (US$31.4 million) on its opening day. The latter figure is the biggest three day opening, ahead of The Mermaid which opened to US$122.3 million in the same number of days. This made it the top film released that weekend worldwide, even ahead of Christopher Nolan's Dunkirk. As a result of excellent reviews and strong word-of-mouth, the film's Sunday take rose 15% from Saturday's, a rare feat in a country where the biggest films are usually the most front-loaded. Also, its Sunday-Monday drop was just 35% and the screen count rose from 19,000+ to 24,000 (52%).

On Monday, it made  (US$41.5 million), a fall of just 35% from its Sunday take and registered the biggest Monday ever in a single territory ahead of Star Wars: The Force Awakens (US$40.1 million). By Thursday, the film had earned past , the fastest film to do so in the least amount of time.

In just ten days, the film grossed  (US$406 million) to become the biggest release of 2017 there, surpassing The Fate of the Furious and the second highest-grossing film ever, behind only The Mermaid. The film's demand was so strong that it made more in its second weekend than the first. The 30% weekend-to-weekend hike is among the top ten smallest second weekend drop, and the smallest for a non-Hollywood production. On 7 August 2017, it became the biggest ever Chinese film released just after twelve days of release. Similarly, The Mermaid overtook Monster Hunt in February 2016 after twelve days. The film began to shed a considerable number of theatres by its third weekend mainly to make room for new releases such as Guilty of Mind, The Adventurers and Legend of the Naga Pearls, resulting in the film falling by 49% earning another  (US$78.5 million), though still maintaining the top spot. Twenty five days after the film's release, it surpassed Avatar to become the second highest-grossing film in a single-territory and is behind only Star Wars: The Force Awakens. It topped the box office charts in China for four consecutive weekends, or a record breaking thirty consecutive days. It was eventually overtaken by French film Valerian and the City of a Thousand Planets on its thirty-first day. At that time, Valerian played 78,000 times while Wolf Warrior 2 was still screened 32,500 times. The film sold 159million tickets at the Chinese box office.

The film remained the highest-grossing film in China until November 24, 2021, when it was overtaken by the war epic The Battle at Lake Changjin.

Critical response
In China, Wolf Warrior 2 received praise for its patriotic plot, special effects, action sequences and the cast's performances. As of August 2017, the film scored 7.6 on Douban versus the previous film's 6.8.; on Mtime, it scored 7.5 versus 7. Film critic Zhang Chuan argued that the movie was "a decent Chinese film in visual effects, story telling, and action scenes", and that it was "comparable to its Hollywood counterparts" in terms of these aspects. Wenhui Daily considered the film to be a milestone in the history of Chinese cinema with "stories, connotations, and structures". Several other Chinese state-owned and military-affiliated outlets praised the film. 

However, its reception in China was not uniformly positive. By May 2020, the Douban rating dropped to 7.1 with the top positive and top negative reviews each receiving 39,148 and 35,822 supporters respectively. Yin Shanshan, a lecturer at the Central Academy of Drama, a top drama school in China, criticized the film as excessively violent and "psychopathic, worthless, without values or logic" on her Sina Weibo account. Tsinghua University Professor Xiao Ying echoed criticism from some foreign reviewers who found the film to be a Chinese imitation of Rambo: First Blood Part II, and he contrasted this with greater praise for Dunkirk released in the same year.

Internationally, the film received more mixed responses. Metacritic, which uses a weighted average, assigned Wolf Warrior 2 a score of 44 out of 100 based on four critics, indicating "mixed or average reviews". Much of the criticism was directed towards the plot and screenplay, alleging similarities to Blood Diamond, Black Hawk Down, Tears of the Sun, and Rambo: First Blood Part II. Frank Scheck of The Hollywood Reporter wrote, "The star's charisma is enhanced by his athletic prowess, which makes the hand-to-hand combat particularly arresting, especially a brutal brawl between him and Grillo that provides a fitting climax. The breathless pacing thankfully doesn't allow much time for viewers to ponder the plot holes or worry about character development, although the two-hour running time results in overkill fatigue." Stanley Rosen, a professor at the University of Southern California who studies Chinese society and cinema, said to New York Times, "It's a very individualist personal quest, which is much more of a Hollywood thing. They're definitely downplaying the Communist Party in favor of patriotism and defending Chinese people and Chinese interests all over the world." Simon Abrams of RogerEbert.com severely criticized the film, writing that "its characters' sense of patriotism is built on the back of racist assumptions that would, in a European or American narrative, be rightfully criticized for being part of an ugly 'white savior' power fantasy", and stated that the film "lectures you, pummels you, then expects you to cheer."

Rob Hunter of the Film School Rejects, in his positive review of the film, wrote: "Wolf Warrior 2 still suffers some of the same issues that dogged the first film, but the improvements elsewhere make for a noticeably better and more entertaining action movie. It's a fun movie blending lots of action, some humor, and "feelings" for friends and family, and if the next one improves at this same rate Wolf Warrior 3 is going to be something even more special." In a less enthusiastic review, Noel Murray of the Los Angeles Times wrote that the "blandly generic" film features digital effects that "look fake," but praised its stunts and pointed out "it's fascinating to see a film so closely mimic big-budget Hollywood war pictures, but from an opposing socio-political perspective." The Guardian described the movie as "the undisputed torchbearer for this new generation of [Chinese] patriotic action dramas."

Evan Osnos points out how "Wolf Warrior II captures a new, muscular iteration of China's self-narrative, much as Rambo's heroics expressed the swagger of the Reagan era." Jonathan Papish from China Film Insider described the tone of Chinese nationalism in the movie as being "definitely a product of Xi's reign and the idea of [China's] rejuvenation".

Accolades

Sequel
A sequel, Wolf Warrior 3, has been confirmed at the end of the mid-credits scene of Wolf Warrior 2. This was later confirmed by Wu Jing.

Influence
Since its release the movie has been used for nationalist sentiments, most prominently by associating a group of Chinese diplomats and their approach as Wolf Warrior Diplomats by Chinese media.

See also
 List of submissions to the 90th Academy Awards for Best Foreign Language Film
 List of Chinese submissions for the Academy Award for Best Foreign Language Film

References

External links

 
 
 
 

2017 3D films
2017 action films
4DX films
Polybona Films films
China Film Group Corporation films
Chinese action thriller films
Chinese 3D films
Chinese nonlinear narrative films
Chinese sequel films
Films about military personnel
Films about the People's Liberation Army
Films directed by Wu Jing (actor)
Films scored by Joseph Trapanese
Films set in Africa
Films shot in Hebei
Films shot in Gauteng
2010s Mandarin-language films
Chinese propaganda films
Works about Chinese military personnel
Films shot in Zhangjiakou